DD-WRT is Linux-based firmware for wireless routers and access points. Originally designed for the Linksys WRT54G series, it now runs on a wide variety of models. DD-WRT is one of a handful of third-party firmware projects designed to replace manufacturer's original firmware with custom firmware offering additional features or functionality.

Sebastian Gottschall, a.k.a. "BrainSlayer", is the founder and primary maintainer of the DD-WRT project.  The letters "DD" in the project name are the German license-plate letters for vehicles from Dresden, where the development team lived.  The remainder of the name was taken from the Linksys WRT54G model router, a home router popular in 2002–2004. WRT is assumed to be a reference to 'wireless router'.

Buffalo Technology and other companies have shipped routers with factory-installed, customized versions of DD-WRT. In January 2016, Linksys started to offer DD-WRT firmware for their routers.

Features
Among the common features of DD-WRT are
 access control
 bandwidth monitoring
 quality of service
 WPA/WPA2/WPA3 (personal and enterprise)
 iptables and IPset (on some models) & SPI firewall
 Universal Plug and Play
 Wake-on-LAN
 Dynamic DNS
 AnchorFree VPN
 wireless access point configuration
 WDS - Wireless Distribution System
 multiple SSIDs
 overclocking
 transmission power control
 Transmission BitTorrent client
 Tor
 router linking
 ssh
 telnet
 RADIUS support
 XLink Kai networks
 OpenVPN
 WireGuard

It is also possible to build a bespoke firmware package.

Version history

Router hardware supported
DD-WRT supports many different router models, both new and obsolete. The project maintains a full list of currently supported models and known incompatible devices.

See also

 BusyBox
 OpenWrt
 List of router firmware projects

References

External links

 
 DD-WRT Forum
 DD-WRT software version control

Custom firmware
Free system software
Routing software
Linux distributions without systemd
Linux distributions